Matilde Mota Veiga Santiago Fidalgo (born 15 May 1994) is a Portuguese professional footballer who plays as a right-back for Spanish Liga F club Real Betis and the Portugal women's national team.

Fidalgo made her senior debut for Portugal in September 2013 and represented her country at UEFA Women's Euro 2017.

Career

Club
Fidalgo was born in São Domingos de Benfica, Lisbon and from a young age has played football. In 2009, Fidalgo started her career at CF Benfica in the Portuguese League. She played for the Lisbon club until June 2017 when she moved to Sporting CP. With Benfica, Fidalgo won one national title in the 2015/2016 season and was elected "Best Player" for the 2015/2016 season by the "Sindicato dos Jogadores Profissionais de Futebol (SJPF)". She also captained the team for several seasons. In March 2018, Fidalgo won the "Quinas de Ouro" award as one of the "11 Best Players in the Women's League". The award is given by the Portuguese Football Federation.
In 2018 she moved to the rival team SC Braga, with whom she won the Portuguese League title – Braga's first championship win. 
On 30 May 2019, it was announced that Fidalgo was signed to Women's Super League team Manchester City. Fidalgo moved to S.L Benfica on 4 August 2020, after only making two league appearances and becoming third-choice behind Janine Beckie and even Georgia Stanway, who was not a natural right-back.

International
On February 22, 2011, Fidalgo debuted for Portugal U19 in a win against Finland U19 for the 2011 UEFA Women's Under-19 Championship Qualifying Round. She also represented Portugal at the qualifying stages of the 2012 UEFA Women's Under-19 Championship and the 2013 UEFA Women's Under-19 Championship. On September 26, 2013, Fidalgo debuted for the Portuguese Senior Team in a win against Greece, a 2015 FIFA Women's World Cup qualification's match. Since then, she represented Portugal in several international competitions including the qualifying stages for the UEFA Women's Euro 2017 and the  2019 FIFA Women's World Cup. On July 6, 2017, Fidalgo was called by coach Francisco Neto to represent Portugal at the UEFA Women's Euro 2017, the first time the Portuguese team reached the final stage of a big international tournament. She didn't play in any matches as her team was eliminated while still in the Group Stage.

Personal life
Fidalgo is a cousin of Bernardo Silva. Both were born in 1994, share the same great-grandparents, play internationally for the Portugal national team and once both played their club football at Manchester City.

Honours
CF Benfica
Campeonato Nacional II Divisão: 2009–10
Campeonato Nacional Feminino: 2014–15, 2015–16
Taça de Portugal Feminina: 2014–15, 2015–16
Supertaça de Portugal Feminina: 2015

Sporting CP
Campeonato Nacional Feminino: 2017–18
Taça de Portugal Feminina: 2017–18
Supertaça de Portugal Feminina: 2017

SC Braga
Campeonato Nacional Feminino: 2018–19

Manchester City
Women's FA Cup: 2019–20

Benfica
Campeonato Nacional Feminino: 2020–21
Taça da Liga: 2019–20, 2020–21

References

External links
 
 
 
 
 Matilde Fidalgo at playmakerstats.com
 

1994 births
Living people
Footballers from Lisbon
Portugal women's international footballers
Portuguese women's footballers
Women's association football defenders
Campeonato Nacional de Futebol Feminino players
Women's Super League players
C.F. Benfica (women) footballers
Sporting CP (women's football) players
S.C. Braga (women's football) players
Manchester City W.F.C. players
S.L. Benfica (women) footballers
Portuguese expatriate sportspeople in England
Expatriate women's footballers in England
UEFA Women's Euro 2017 players
Portuguese expatriate sportspeople in Spain
Portuguese expatriate women's footballers
Real Betis Féminas players